Ra'eese Aleem (born June 21, 1990) is an American professional boxer who held the WBA interim super bantamweight title in 2021.

Professional career

Ra'eese Aleem turned professional in 2011, with a second-round technical knockout of Dewaun Bell. He amassed a 15-0 record before making his TV debut on February 14, 2020, with a third-round stoppage victory against Saul Eduardo Hernandez. On August 1, 2020, he notched a tenth-round technical knockout of Marcus Bates. Bates was a last minute replacement for Aleem when his original opponent Tramaine Williams pulled out to be elevated to the main event as Stephen Fulton's substitute when he was sick with COVID-19.

Aleem was scheduled to face Vic Pasillas for the WBA interim super bantamweight title on January 23, 2021, at the Mohegan Sun Arena in Montville, Connecticut. He won the fight by an eleventh-round technical knockout, after knocking Pasillas down in rounds two, six, nine and once in round eleven.

Aleem is scheduled to fight Eduardo Baez on November 27, 2021.

Professional boxing record

References

External links

1990 births
Living people
American male boxers
African-American boxers
Sportspeople from Muskegon, Michigan
Boxers from Michigan
Super-bantamweight boxers
World super-bantamweight boxing champions
21st-century African-American sportspeople